Mik Snijder (born 6 February 1931) is a retired Dutch road cyclist who was active between 1954 and 1961. He won the Ronde van Overijssel in 1954, the Olympia's Tour in 1961, and one stage of the Tour de Tunisie in 1960.

References

1931 births
Living people
Dutch male cyclists
People from Tynaarlo
Cyclists from Drenthe